Garden Island may refer to:

Australia
 Garden Island, New South Wales, location of major naval and dockyard facilities on Sydney Harbour
 Garden Island Naval Chapel
 Garden Island (Huon River), an island in south-eastern Tasmania
 Garden Island (Tamar River), an island in northern Tasmania
 Garden Island (Western Australia), near Perth, location of HMAS Stirling naval base
 Garden Island (South Australia), an island in South Australia
Garden Island, South Australia, a locality associated with the island of the same name
 Garden Island, a historical name for Smooth Island (Tasmania)
 Grindal Island, South Australia, also known as Garden Island

Canada
 Garden Island (Lake Huron), an island of Ontario
 Garden Island (Lake Nipissing), an island of Ontario
 Garden Island (Ontario), Lake Ontario

United States
 Garden Island (Michigan)
 Garden Island State Recreation Area, Minnesota
 A nickname for the Hawaiian island of Kauai
 The Garden Island, the daily newspaper serving the island of Kauai

See also 
 Garden Isle, a 1973 short film
 Gardiner Island (disambiguation)
 Gardner Island, Antarctica